Zhao is a Chinese-language surname. The name is first in the Hundred Family Surnames – the traditional list of all Chinese surnames – because it was the emperor's surname of the Song Dynasty (960–1279) when the list was compiled. The first line of the poem is 趙錢孫李 (Zhao, Qian, Sun, Li).

Zhao may be romanized as "Chiu" from the Cantonese pronunciation, and is romanized in Taiwan and Hong Kong as "Chao" in the Wade–Giles system. It is cognate with the Vietnamese family name "Triệu" and with the Korean family name most commonly romanized as "Cho" (조).

The romanization is shared with the much rarer family name Zhào (兆).

Evolution of the Zhao clan

Modern culture 
In Lu Xun's novel The True Story of Ah Q, Ah Q said he belonged to the same clan as Mr. Zhao, who was an honored landlord of the village. Mr. Zhao was very angry. He slapped Ah Q's face and said, 'How could you be named Zhao!—Do you think you are worthy of the name Zhao?'

Since 2015 or earlier, in Chinese internet, Zhao became the intimation of Chinese Communist Party and 'State of Zhao' became the intimation of China. Similarly, 'The Zhao Family' refers to the dignitaries of China, and "The Zhao's Army" refers to People's Liberation Army. 'How could you be named Zhao!' is popular to satirize the people who are humble but pretend to be powerful.

In 2016, the blog writer Program Think set up a GitHub project named Zhao. The project collects the relationships among more than 700 people in over 130 families including Xi Jinping, the General Secretary of the Chinese Communist Party and many other high level government officials of Chinese Communist Party. The Cyberspace Administration of China requested GitHub to remove the project. Error status code 451 would be reached if the connection request to the project is from China.

Prominent people with the family name

Historical figures
 Zhao Zheng (traditional Chinese: 趙政), the first emperor of China, founder of the Qin dynasty, most commonly known as Qin Shi Huang (traditional Chinese: 秦始皇)
 Zhao Chengjiao (趙成蟜), the first emperor's half brother, after the first emperor inherited the throne, he rebelled and was killed by the emperor.
 Zhao Chou Warlord during the Late Tang Dynasty
 Zhao Dejun general of the Five Dynasties and Ten Kingdoms period state Later Tang and Later Tang's predecessor state Jin
 Zhao Gao close advisor to emperors during the Qin Dynasty one of the most corrupt, villainous, violent and powerful eunuchs in Chinese history
 Zhao Guangyi Chancellor of Southern Han
 Zhao Jieyu a consort of Emperor Wu of the Han dynasty
 Zhao Kuangyin (趙匡胤) or Emperor Taizu of Song (宋太祖), the founder of the Song Dynasty
 Zhao Deyin warlord late in the Tang Dynasty, 
 Zhao Dezhao second son of Emperor Taizu 
 Zhao Feiyan Empress of the Western Han Dynasty to Emperor Cheng
 Zhao Hede Imperial Consort to Emperor Cheng of Han sister to Empress Zhao Feiyan 
 Zhao Kuangyi Brother of Zhao Kuangyin and Second Emperor of the Song Dynasty 
 Zhao Heng Third Emperor of The Song Dynasty
 Zhao Zhen Fourth Emperor of The Song Dynasty
 Zhao Shu Fifth Emperor of The Song Dynasty
 Zhao Xu Sixth Emperor of The Song Dynasty
 Zhao Xu Seventh Emperor of the Song Dynasty
 Zhao Ji Eighth Emperor of The Song Dynasty famous for being a skilled poet, painter, calligrapher, and musician.
 Zhao Boju Painter during the Song Dynasty
 Zhao Yun (traditional Chinese: 趙雲), General of Shu Han during the era of Three Kingdoms
 Zhao Mengfu calligrapher, descendant of Song Imperial Family
 Zhao Yong calligrapher, son of Zhao Mengfu, descendant of Song Imperial Family
 Zhao Yiguang , Literary figure and author during Ming dynasty, relative of Zhao Mengfu, descendant of Song Imperial Family

Modern figures
 Amanda Zhao Wei, Chinese student who was murdered by Li Ang
 Zhao Benshan (traditional Chinese: 趙本山), comedian/actor/director
 Chloé Zhao (born 1982), Chinese filmmaker
 Zhao Dan (traditional Chinese: 趙丹), Chinese actor popular during the golden age of Chinese Cinema.
 Zhao Erfeng – warlord and historian
 Zhao Erxun – governor of Sichuan
 Zhao Fuxin (1904-1999), physics professor
 Zhao Hongbo (traditional Chinese: 趙宏博), a pairs figure skater
 Jack Zhao, Chinese bridge player
 Zhao Jiamin (traditional Chinese: 趙嘉敏), Chinese idol singer and former member of the Chinese idol group SNH48
 Zhao Jingmin UN Commander, Chinese Major General
 Zhao Jingshen (traditional Chinese: 趙景深), novelist.
 Zhao Jiping (traditional Chinese: 趙季平), composer
 Zhao Jiwei Chinese basketball player
Zhao Lijian Chinese politician
 Zhao Liying - Chinese actress
 Zhao Lusi, Chinese actress
 Zhao Shuli (traditional Chinese: 趙樹理), novelist
 Qing Zhao – Electronics scientist
 Vincent Zhao (traditional Chinese: 趙文卓), martial artist and actor
 Zhao Wei (traditional Chinese: 趙薇, simplified Chinese: 赵薇), actress
 Xiran Jay Zhao (born 1997) – Chinese-Canadian writer
 Zhao Xintong (born 1997) — Chinese snooker player
 Zhao Yi (traditional Chinese:趙翼), poet, historian, and critic during the Qing Dynasty.
 Zhao Yiman (simplified Chinese: 赵一曼), Chinese freedom fighter
 Zhao Yiqin, Chinese actor
 Zhao Yue (traditional Chinese: 趙粵), Chinese singer, member of Chinese idol group SNH48, and member of Chinese girl group BonBon Girls 303
 Zhao Yongsheng – race walker
 Zhao Yun, Hong Kong lawyer.
 Zhao Zhiqian (traditional Chinese:趙之謙), Qing Dynasty calligrapher.
 Zhao Ziyang (traditional Chinese: 趙紫陽, simplified Chinese: 赵紫阳),  former General Secretary of the Chinese Communist Party and Premier of China
 Zhao Zong-Yuan – Chinese-Australian chess grandmaster
 Elaine L. Chao (traditional Chinese: 趙小蘭), American politician, served as the 24th United States Secretary of Labor
 Rosalind Chao (traditional Chinese: 趙家玲), American actress
 Sam Chu Lin (traditional Chinese: 趙帝恩), American journalist
 Yuen Ren Chao (traditional Chinese: 趙元任), Chinese linguist
 Cecil Chao (traditional Chinese: 趙世曾), Hong Kong entrepreneur
 Chao Chuan (traditional Chinese: 趙傳), Taiwanese pop singer
 Mark Chao (traditional Chinese: 趙又廷), Taiwanese actor, singer and model
 Cindy Chao (traditional Chinese: 趙心綺), Taiwanese jewellery designer
 Bondy Chiu (traditional Chinese: 趙學而), Hong Kong singer and actress
 Angie Chiu (traditional Chinese: 趙雅芝), Hong Kong actress, third runner up in the 1973 Miss Hong Kong pageant
 Bryan Chiu – retired Canadian professional football player; played Centre for the Montreal Alouettes in the CFL from 1997 to 2010
 Baldwin Chiu (traditional Chinese:趙保榮) as Only Won, Hip Hop Artist, Actor, Producer, Martial Artist, National White House Engineering Spokesperson
 Kenny Chiu (traditional Chinese: 趙錦榮), Canadian politician, Member of Parliament for Steveston—Richmond East
 Judy Chu (traditional Chinese: 趙美心), American politician and educator
 Suisheng Zhao, Chinese political scientist

See also 
Zhao family
Zhao (state)
House of Zhao
Hata Clan of Japan
Aisin Gioro family

Notes

References

 
 
 
 
 
 
 
 
 
 
 
 
 "赵氏"撰写《红楼梦》
 Frederic, Louis (2002). "Japan Encyclopedia." Cambridge, Massachusetts: Harvard University Press.
 Rimer, J. Thomas and Yamazaki Masakazu trans. (1984). "On the Art of the Nō Drama: The Major Treatises of Zeami." Princeton, New Jersey: Princeton University Press.
 Teshima, Ikuro (1973). The Ancient Refugees From Religious Persecution in Japan: The Tribe of Hada – Their Religious and Cultural Influence. 1.
 Shinsen Shōjiroku "出自秦始皇帝三世孫孝武王也"
 McCullough, William H. (1999). "The capital and its society". The Cambridge History of Japan, Volume 2: Heian Japan. Cambridge University Press. p. 98. .
 McCullough, William H. (1999). "The capital and its society". The Cambridge History of Japan, Volume 2: Heian Japan. Cambridge University Press. p. 97–98. .
 Ben Ami-Shillony, The Jews and the Japanese: The Successful Outsiders, pp. 135–7 (Rutland, VT: Tuttle, 1991)

External links
 Chinese Zhao surname history

Royalty
Chinese-language surnames
Individual Chinese surnames